4-Butylresorcinol, sometimes called 4-n-butylresorcinol, is a chemical used to treat hyperpigmentation of the epidermis.  Hyperpigmentation is believed to be related to the enzyme tyrosinase which produces melanin.  Among several chemicals known to inhibit tyrosinase production, such as hydroquinone, arbutin, and kojic acid, 4-butylresorcinol has been found to be the most powerful inhibitor by a wide margin.

References

 Hydroquinones